CFO may refer to:

Finance
 Collateralized fund obligation, a financial instrument
 Cash flow from operating activities, in financial accounting
 Chief financial officer, an officer of a company
 CFO (magazine), a monthly publication for chief financial officers

Organizations
 Commission on Filipinos Overseas, a government agency in the Philippines
 Chemin de fer de l'Outaouais, a railroad in Quebec
 CTBC Flying Oyster, a professional esports team in Taiwan

Other uses
 Carrier frequency offset, a type of degradation observed in transmission of radio signals
 Chalfont & Latimer station, Buckinghamshire, England (National Rail station code)
 Chief Fire Officer, the head of a fire brigade
 Chief Firearms Officer, in Canada
 Charles Foster Offdensen, a fictional character from Metalocalypse